Rajkumar Kohli (born 14 September 1930) is an Indian film director. He was famous for directing several popular Bollywood films such as the 1966 Dulla Bhatti and the 1970s Lootera starring Dara Singh and Nishi (Nishi later married Kohli). Other notable films included films with ensemble cast such as Nagin (1976), Jaani Dushman (1979), Badle Ki Aag, Naukar Biwi Ka and Raaj Tilak (1984).  His films frequently featured actors like Sunil Dutt, Dharmendra, Jeetendra, Shatrughan Sinha and actresses Reena Roy and Anita Raj.

In the early 1990s, Kohli introduced his son Armaan Kohli in the multi-starrer action film Virodhi (1992). He directed his son again in Aulad Ke Dushman (1993) and Qahar (1997). After a hiatus, he returned in 2002 and relaunched his son in another film in the style of his classic 1970s films Nagin and Jaani Dushman titled Jaani Dushman: Ek Anokhi Kahani. However, upon release it was a box office disaster and was heavily criticised.

As director 
1973 - Kahani Hum Sab Ki
1976 - Nagin 
1979 - Muqabla
1979 - Jaani Dushman 
1982 - Badle Ki Aag
1983 - Naukar Biwi Ka 
1984 - Raaj Tilak 
1984 - Jeene Nahi Doonga 
1987 - Insaniyat Ke Dushman
1988 - Inteqam 
1988 - Saazish 
1988 - Bees Saal Baad 
1990 - Pati Patni Aur Tawaif
1992 - Virodhi 
1993 - Aulad Ke Dushman 
1997 - Qahar 
2002 - Jaani Dushman: Ek Anokhi Kahani

As producer  
Gora Aur Kala (1972) Hindi Movie
Danka (1969) Hindi Movie 
Dulla Bhatti (1966) Punjabi Movie
Lootera  (1965) Hindi Movie
Main Jatti Punjab Di (1964) Punjabi
Pind Di Kurhi (1963) Punjabi Movie 
Sapni (1963) Punjabi Movie

References

External links

1930 births
People from Lahore
Hindi-language film directors
Living people
Punjabi people
20th-century Indian film directors
Hindi film producers